Frank Trevor Blevins (3 June 1939 – 7 September 2013) was an Australian politician and 6th Deputy Premier of South Australia from 1992 to 1993 for the South Australian Branch of the Australian Labor Party. Blevins served in both the Legislative Council and House of Assembly. He was a minister in a number of portfolios. In 1983 in a dispute about the use of volunteers in the ambulance service, as minister for Health, he publicly sided with the St. John Council who managed the ambulance service against two unions, the Ambulance Employees Association and the Miscellaneous Workers Association. John Cornwall, reflects that this position probably damaged his credibility at the time, with both unions and the Labor Party. Blevins was Treasurer of South Australia from 1992 to 1993.

Prior to entering parliament he was a British merchant seaman and then a merchant seaman at Whyalla. He died at his home in 2013.

|-

|-

References

2013 deaths
Deaths from cancer in South Australia
Australian Labor Party members of the Parliament of South Australia
Deputy Premiers of South Australia
1939 births
Politicians from Manchester
Treasurers of South Australia